David Sharpe (born October 29, 1990) is a Canadian competition swimmer. He competed in the 200 metre butterfly race at the 2012 Summer Olympics, in London, United Kingdom. His time of 1:59.87 in the heats did not qualify him for the semifinals.

References

1990 births
Living people
Canadian male butterfly swimmers
Olympic swimmers of Canada
Sportspeople from Halifax, Nova Scotia
Swimmers at the 2012 Summer Olympics